USS Cimarron (AO-177) was the lead ship of the Cimarron-class of fleet oilers of the United States Navy. Cimarron was built at the Avondale Shipyards in New Orleans, Louisiana (USA) starting in 1978 and was commissioned in 1981 for service in the Pacific Fleet. Commissioned  10 January 1981, in Oakland, California. The oiler was home ported in Pearl Harbor, Hawaii. Total cost for the ship was $136.7 million.

Jumboization

To increase the fueled load of the Cimarron-class oilers it was decided in the late 1980s to lengthen the ships back in Avondale Shipyards. Cimarron became the first ship complete the so-called "jumboization" from August 1991 to September 1992. A  mid-body section was added to the center of the ship. This mid-body increased fuel capacity by 30,000 barrels and added an ordnance cargo capability of 625 tons. The mid-body also featured an additional emergency diesel generator and two "Standard Tensioned Replenishment Alongside Method" (STREAM) cargo stations. Ballast and cargo transfer systems were fully automated and designed to effect safe and efficient transfer of bulk petroleum cargo.

Operational service

On 26 March 1993 following an emergent underway, Cimarron suffered a main steam leak and Main Reduction Gear (MRG) casualty. The backup Electric Lube Oil Service Pump (ELOP) was degraded and when the ship lost main steam, she subsequently lost MRG lube oil pressure. 18 of 30 journal bearings for the MRG, HP and LP turbines were wiped and Cimarron had to be towed back into Pearl Harbor by USS Salvor. Cimarron spent the summer from March 27 to September 27 in the shipyards repairing the MRG.

After the ship was in Long Beach, it was time to be underway on 15 November for more RAS training this time at sea with the USS Kansas City (AOR-3) off the coast of San Francisco, CA. Cimarron made the transit quickly and efficiently and was called upon to assist a sailing vessel in distress approximately 70 miles of the Northern California coast. Cimarron crewmembers acted as heroes that day as they launched the Rigid inflatable boat (RHIB) in 10–15 foot seas and rescued five crewmembers of the overturned sailboat.

In the early hours of 31 March 1994, Cimarron ran aground off Iroquois Point, Hawaii and despite efforts under her own power she had to request USS Salvor to remove her off the sand bar. CDR Torkel Patterson was relieved by LCDR David Bergin following the incident. The ship received only minor damage. In April 1994 she was underway to American Samoa to celebrate the island's Flag Day.

In November 1994, during ordnance on-load, a Fireman noticed a major leak in the lube oil service system. Investigation led to the discovery of corroded lube oil piping in the Steam Driven Lube Oil Service Pump (SLOP) discharge. Cimarron began repairs and deployment was delayed for two days. Also during this time, NIS investigations began due to rape allegations of a female Cimarron junior sailor against a male Cimarron officer. The investigation revealed other fraternization issues and a large investigation was conducted regarding the command climate. A total of 21 personnel were relieved of their duties, including the Command Master Chief, and remained in Pearl Harbor when the ship deployed.

However, to save expenses and in keeping with the Navy's move away from steam propulsion, the class was to be replaced by the diesel-powered Henry J. Kaiser-class replenishment oiler manned by the Military Sealift Command (MSC). Cimarron was decommissioned in 1998. She was struck from the Naval Vessel Register the following year and her title was transferred to the Maritime Administration. On 26 January 1999 she departed Pearl Harbor under tow and was placed in Suisun Bay, California, with the National Defense Reserve Fleet, 
She was sold for scrapping on October 1, 2012. The ship passed through the Panama Canal on 15 December 2012 on its way to a ESCO Marine in Brownsville, Texas for recycling.

Awards
 Navy Meritorious Unit Commendation - (Aug-Nov 1990) BATTLE GROUP DELTA 
 Navy E Ribbon - (1982, 1983, 1984, 1990)
 Southwest Asia Service Medal - (1990, 1994)
 Humanitarian Service Medal - (25 Jul 1990)
 Captain Edward F. Ney Memorial Award - (1984)

Deployments
 November 1982 - May 1983
 May 1984 - November 1984
 February 1986 - August 1986
 October 1987 - March 1988
 March 1990 - November 1990
 November 1994 - April 1995 (Constellation Battle Group)
 April 1997 - October 1997 (Constellation Battle Group)

References

External links
Navsource
USS Cimarron Association

 

Cimarron-class fleet replenishment oilers
Ships built in Bridge City, Louisiana
1979 ships